The National Ski Jumping Centre, nicknamed Snow Ruyi, is a Chinese ski jumping hill in Chongli District, Zhangjiakou, Hebei Province, China, opened in 2021.

After the Olympics, the facilities shall serve as a national training centre, potentially also including junior hills to be built. Hill was designed by Zhiang Li, and got its widely known name after "Ruyi", a traditional Chinese ornament symbolizing good luck.

Beside summer ski jumping on plastic, the flat finish (jump out) area of the hill stadium, with grandstand capacity for 6,000 people, will be also used as a football (soccer) pitch in the summer.

History
In 2017, construction started and was planned to be completed in 2019. But due to the unconventional location in between two hills, the elaborate works were done in November 2020.

The Olympic ski jumping stadium was then inaugurated with a celebration on 21 December 2020. One month later, on 19 January 2021, CCP general secretary Xi Jinping visited the Olympic sports facilities.

Due to the COVID-19 pandemic, all international test events, including World Cup and Continental Cup, in the 2020–21 season had to be cancelled. Premiere jumps were hosted at Continental Cup in December 2021.

On 5 February 2022, Slovenian female ski jumper Urša Bogataj, became the first olympic champion with gold at new normal hill (HS106) and also set hill record at 108 metres (354 ft) in the first round.

On 6 February 2022, Japan ski jumper Ryōyū Kobayashi became the Olympic champion at men's normal hill (HS106) event. Danil Sadreev from Russia set hil record in 1st round at 107.5 metres (353 ft).

On 7 February 2022, Slovenian national team (Nika Križnar, Timi Zajc, Urša Bogataj and Peter Prevc) won historic first ever ski jumping mixed team event in Olympics history with the outstanding record advantage of 111.2 points in front of the runner-up Russia. Third place took Canada, a totally unexpected result. Four women's disqualifications due to the irregular dress equipment in teams of Japan, Austria, Germany and Norway, did change the course of the event, especially for the podiums, but did not in any way influenced in a battle for gold, where Slovenia firmly held strong lead from the beginning of the competition.

Due to controversy of four disqualifications at the ski jumping mixed team event and complaints of several national teams, Agnieszka Aga Baczkowska who is responsible for equipment control, told the media what was actually happening behind the scenes. She explained that some of the four disqualified female had the dresses even up to 10 cm too big according to the FIS rules, it was obvious even on the eye.

On 9 February 2022, German Vinzenz Geiger won gold medal at Nordic combined Individual normal hill/10 km (HS 106) event. Japanese Ryōta Yamamoto tied absolute hill record at 108 metres (354 ft).

On 12 February 2022, Marius Lindvik became the Olympic champion at men's large hill (HS140) event. Ryōyū Kobayashi was leading after 1st run, where he set absolute hill record at 142 metres (466 ft).

On 14 February 2022, German Vinzenz Geiger set the absolute hill record at 142.5 metres (468 ft) on Nordic combined training. Austria won gold medal at Men's large hill team (HS 140) event later that day.

Olympics

Ski jumping

Nordic combined 
Cross-country skiing will be held in Kuyangshu Nordic Center.

World Cup

Women

Men

Profile

Normal hill

Large hill

References

External links
 beijing2022.cn official
 Snow Ruyi skisprungschanzen.com

Sports venues completed in 2021
Venues of the 2022 Winter Olympics
2021 establishments in China
Ski jumping at the 2022 Winter Olympics